Tytherton may refer to

East Tytherton, a hamlet in the parish of Bremhill, Wiltshire, England
Tytherton Lucas, a hamlet in the parish of Bremhill, Wiltshire, England